The siege of Adrianople in 813 was a part of the wars of the Byzantine Empire with the Bulgarian khan Krum (Byzantine-Bulgarian Wars). It began soon after the Byzantine field army was defeated in the battle of Versinikia on 22 June. At first the besieging force was commanded by Krum's brother (whose name is not mentioned in the primary sources). The khan himself went on with an army to Constantinople. After an unsuccessful Byzantine attempt to murder him ruined all prospects for negotiations with them, Krum ravaged much of Eastern Thrace and then turned against Adrianople which was still under siege. The city—one of the most important Byzantine fortresses in Thrace—held out for a while despite being attacked with siege engines. Yet, without any help from outside, the garrison was forced to capitulate due to starvation. On Krum's order the population of Adrianople and the surrounding area (numbering about 10,000) was transferred to Bulgarian territory north of the Danube.

Under the peace treaty, concluded in 815, Adrianople remained in the Byzantine empire.

Sources 
 Runciman, Steven: A history of the First Bulgarian Empire , G. Bell & Sons, London 1930 (online edition "Books about Macedonia" , retrieved on 23.12.2008)
 Гюзелев, В. Кавханите и ичиргу-боилите на българското ханство-царство (VII-XI в.), Пловдив 2007, 
 Златарски, В. История на българската държава през средните векове, том I, част 1, София 1970 (цитиран по електронното издание в „Книги за Македония“, достъп от 2.1.2009)
 Острогорски, Г. История на византийската държава, София 1998, 
 Рънсиман, Ст. История на Първото българско царство, ИК „Иван Вазов“, София 1993
 Fine, J. The Early Medieval Balkans: A Critical Survey from the Sixth to the Late Twelfth Century, University of Michigan Press, 1991,

Footnotes 

810s conflicts
813
810s in the Byzantine Empire
9th century in Bulgaria
Sieges involving the First Bulgarian Empire
Adrianople 813
History of Edirne